Minuscule 56 (in the Gregory-Aland numbering), ε 517 (von Soden), is a Greek minuscule manuscript of the New Testament, on paper leaves. Palaeographically it has been assigned to the 15th century. The manuscript has complex contents and some marginalia.

Description 

The codex contains complete text of the four Gospels on 232 paper leaves (size ). The text is written in one column per page, 24 lines per page.

Text 

The Greek text of the codex is a representative of the Byzantine text-type. Hermann von Soden classified it to the textual family Kx. Aland did not assign it to any Category of New Testament manuscripts. According to the Claremont Profile Method it represents the textual family Kr in Luke 1, Luke 10, and Luke 20. It creates textual cluster with 58. It means it has a strict the Byzantine text.

The text contains some various readings. According to C. R. Gregory it is a sister or daughter of the codex 54.

In John 8:6 it has textual reading και προσποιουμενος.

History 

The manuscript was written by John Serbopoulos in England. In 1502 it was presented to the Lincoln College by Edmund Audley, Bishop of Salisbury, where it is still housed, under shelf number Gr. 18, at Oxford.

Walton gave some various readings. It was examined by Mill (Lincoln 1), Orlando T. Dobbin, and Scrivener. Dobbin compared its readings with Codex Montfortianus and 58 in 1922 places. Pascoe detected 34 omissions for four chapters. C. R. Gregory saw it in 1883.

See also 

 List of New Testament minuscules
 Biblical manuscript
 Textual criticism

References

Further reading 

 Orlando T. Dobbin, Collation of the Codex Montfortianus (London, 1854), p. 30-31.

External links

 Online images of minuscule 56 (Digital Microfilm) at the CSNTM.

Greek New Testament minuscules
15th-century biblical manuscripts
Lincoln College, Oxford